Arachidicoccus rhizosphaerae is a Gram-negative, plant-growth-promoting, non-spore-forming and non-motile bacterium from the genus of Arachidicoccus which has been isolated from rhizospheric soil.

References

Chitinophagia
Bacteria described in 2015